Fuchien Province  , also romanized as Fujian and rendered as Fukien, is a nominal province of the Republic of China (ROC, Taiwan) without formal administrative function. It includes three small archipelagos off the coast of the Fujian Province of the People's Republic of China, namely the Matsu Islands, which make up Lienchiang County, and the Wuqiu Islands and Kinmen Islands, which make up Kinmen County. The seat of the provincial government is Jincheng Township of Kinmen County serves as its de facto capital.

The current Fuchien Province of the ROC, also known as the Golden Horse (after the literal reading of the Chinese character abbreviation for "Kinmen-Matsu"), comprise 0.5% of the current ROC's territories. The province was once part of the historical Fuchien Province based on Chinese mainland, encompassing both of mainland and island portions. The Chinese Civil War resulted in the effective partition of ROC's Fuchien in 1949, and the mainland portion has since been under the People's Republic of China's rule, while the offshore islands remained under ROC control, notwithstanding that both governments have not constitutionally recognized the resulting partition. During the Cold War period, Fujian was under the military administration. Travel restrictions from Taiwan island would remain in effect until 1992.

Following constitutional reforms launched in 1996, the ROC authorities decided to downsize the provincial structure to solve the problem of overlapping personnel and administrative resources between the provincial and central governments, and cut excessive public spending. The provinces were streamlined and ceased to be self-governing bodies in December 1998, with their administrative functions transferred to the Executive Yuan's subsidiary, the National Development Council, as well as second-tier local governments such as counties. The Kinmen-Matsu Joint Services Center was founded in 2017 and all provincial governmental organs were de facto formally abolished by July 2018, with the remaining functions transferred to the ministries of the Executive Yuan and the NDC.

History

Imperial China 

The Han dynasty collapsed at the end of the 2nd century AD, paving the way for the Three Kingdoms era. Sun Quan, the founder of the Kingdom of Wu, spent nearly twenty years subduing the Shan Yue people, the branch of the Yue living in mountains.

The first wave of immigration of the noble class arrived in the province in the early 4th century when the Western Jin dynasty collapsed and the north was torn apart by invasions by nomadic peoples from the north, as well as civil war.  These immigrants were primarily from eight families in central China: Lin (林), Huang (黃), Chen (陳), Zheng (鄭), Zhan (詹), Qiu (邱), He (何), and Hu (胡). The first four remain as the major surnames of modern Fujian.

Nevertheless, isolation from nearby areas owing to rugged terrain contributed to Fujian's relatively backward economy and level of development, despite major population boost from northern China during the "barbarian" invasions. Population density in Fujian remained low compared to the rest of China. Only two commanderies and sixteen counties were established by the Western Jin dynasty. Like other southern provinces such as Guangdong, Guangxi, Guizhou, and Yunnan, Fujian often served as a destination for exiled prisoners and dissidents at that time.

During the Southern and Northern Dynasties era, the Southern Dynasties reigned south of the Yangtze River, including Fujian.

The Tang dynasty (618–907) oversaw the next golden age of China. As the Tang dynasty ended, China was torn apart in the period of the Five Dynasties and Ten Kingdoms. During this time, a second major wave of immigration arrived in the safe haven of Fujian, led by General Wang, who set up an independent Kingdom of Min with its capital in Fuzhou. After the death of the founding king, however, the kingdom suffered from internal strife, and was soon swallowed up by Southern Tang, another southern kingdom.

Quanzhou was blooming into a seaport under the reign of the Min Kingdom, and is the largest seaport in the world. Its population is also greater than Fuzhou. Due to the Ispah Rebellion, Quanzhou was severely damaged. In the early Ming dynasty, Quanzhou was the staging area and supply depot of Zheng He's naval expeditions. Further development was severely hampered by the sea trade ban of the Ming dynasty, and the area was superseded by nearby ports of Guangzhou, Hangzhou, Ningbo and Shanghai despite the lifting of the ban in 1550. Large scale piracy by Wokou (Japanese pirates) was eventually wiped out by Chinese military and Japanese authority of Toyotomi Hideyoshi.

Qing Dynasty 
Late Ming and early Qing dynasty symbolized an era of large influx of refugees and another 20 years of sea trade ban under the Kangxi Emperor, a measure intended to counter the refuge Ming government of Koxinga in Taiwan. Incoming refugees, however, did not translate into a major labor force owing to their re-migration into prosperous regions of Guangdong. In 1683, the Qing dynasty conquered Taiwan and annexed it into Fujian province, as Taiwan Prefecture. Settlement of Taiwan by Han Chinese followed, and the majority of people in Taiwan are descendants of Hoklo people from Southern Fujian. Fujian arrived at its present extent after Taiwan was split as its own province in 1885. Just ten more years later, Taiwan Province would be lost to Japan due to the Qing losing the First Sino-Japanese War which ended in 1895.

Republic of China  

The Xinhai Revolution deposed the Qing dynasty brought the province into the rule of the Republic of China. Fujian briefly gained independence from China again under the Fujian People's Government until it was recontrolled by the ROC during the Warlord Era.

Parts of the province in the northwestern area of Fujian were controlled by the Jiangxi–Fujian Soviet, a component territory controlled by the Chinese Soviet Republic until its collapse in 1934 at the start of the Long March.

It came under Japanese sea blockade during Second Sino-Japanese War.

During the Chinese Civil War, the ROC lost control of mainland China, including most of Fujian province, and was forced to relocate to Taiwan, while the victorious Chinese Communist forces established the PRC in 1949, subsequently the capital of Fujian was also moved from Foochow to Jincheng. In the Battle of Guningtou, however, ROC forces were able to defend the island of Quemoy (Kinmen) just off the coast of Fujian from communist attack. As a result, the ROC has been able to hold on to a number of offshore islands of Fujian, and has continued to maintain a separate Fujian Provincial Government to govern these islands, parallel to the province of Fujian in mainland China.

In 1956, due to heightened potential for military conflict with the PRC, the ROC central government moved the Fujian provincial government out of Fujian to within Taiwan Province in Xindian (now part of New Taipei), and the islands were placed under an extraordinarily tight military administration due to their extreme proximity to mainland China. This was an unusual situation where the government of a province was located and operating in a different province. With the easing of cross-strait relations between the PRC and ROC and the democratization of the ROC in the 1990s, the islands were returned to civilian government in 1992. On 15 January 1996, the provincial government moved back to Kinmen, on Fujian soil.

Beginning in 2010, the ROC significantly diluted the powers of the two provinces it governs, namely Taiwan and Fujian. Most of the authority at the Fujian province level has been delegated to the two county governments of Kinmen and Lienchiang.

Government

The Governor of Fujian Province was the head of the Fujian Provincial Government, the governor was also titled the "Chairperson of the Fujian Provincial Government". According to the Additional Articles of the Constitution, the governor is appointed by the central government.

The Fujian Provincial Government was located in Jincheng, Kinmen between January 1996 and 2018. In July 2018, the Executive Yuan decided to transfer the duties and functionalities of the provincial government to other branches under the Executive Yuan, including Kinmen-Matsu Joint Services Center and National Development Council The transformations were scheduled to be done by the end of year 2018.

Subdivisions 

Fujian province nominally comprises two counties: Kinmen County and Lienchiang County.

The following are the islands of Fujian under the administration of the ROC, given by county:

The PRC claims Kinmen as a county of Quanzhou, Fujian and the Matsu Islands as a township of Lianjiang County, Fuzhou, Fujian (with some islands claimed as parts of other areas).

Culture and Demography 
Culturally, its population is predominantly of Chinese ethnicity, as Fujian remains the one of the most culturally and linguistically diverse provinces of the country. Each dialects of the language group Min Chinese were most commonly spoken within the province, including the Fuzhou dialect of northeastern Fujian and various Hokkien dialects of southeastern Fujian. Hakka Chinese is also spoken, by the Hakka people in Fujian. Min dialects, Hakka and Mandarin Chinese are mutually unintelligible. Due to emigration, a sizable amount of the ethnic Chinese populations in Southeast Asia speak Southern Min (or Hokkien).

Education 

National Quemoy University

See also 
 Taiwan Province
 Fujian
 Politics of the Republic of China
 Kinmen-Matsu Joint Services Center
 Battle of Kuningtou
 First Taiwan Strait Crisis
 Second Taiwan Strait Crisis
 Third Taiwan Strait Crisis
 Chekiang Province, Republic of China

Notes

Words in native languages

References

External links 

 ROC Fujian Provincial Government 
 

Provinces of the Republic of China (1912–1949)
 
Subdivisions of Taiwan